Eriochilus petricola is a plant in the orchid family Orchidaceae and is endemic to New South Wales. It is a slender ground orchid with a single leaf and up to three small, white to pale pink flowers and grows near rock ledges.

Description
Eriochilus petricola is a terrestrial,  perennial, deciduous, herb with an underground tuber. Flowering occurs from March to May.

Taxonomy and naming
Eriochilus petricola was first formally described in 2004 by David Jones and Mark Clements and the description was published in The Orchadian. The specific epithet (petricola) is derived from the Ancient Greek words petra meaning "rock" or "shelf or ledge of rock" and -cola meaning "dweller"

Distribution and habitat
This orchid grows in shallow, sandy soil on and near rock ledges between Nowra, Ku-ring-gai Chase National Park and inland to the Blue Mountains.

References 

petricola
Plants described in 2004
Endemic orchids of Australia
Orchids of New South Wales